Allohahella is a genus of bacteria from the family of Hahellaceae.

References

 

Oceanospirillales
Bacteria genera